Erns Kleynhans is a South African politician currently serving as a Member of the North West Provincial Legislature for the Freedom Front Plus. Kleynhans served as a councillor of the Matlosana Local Municipality from 2016 to 2019.

Political career
Kleynhans has been involved with the Freedom Front Plus since 2015. He is currently a member of the strategy committee of the party's federal council.

Kleynhans was elected as a proportional representation councillor of the Matlosana Local Municipality in August 2016. During his tenure on the council, he was a member of the committees on infrastructure and economic growth.

Following the 2019 general election, Kleynhans was selected to represent the FF Plus in the North West Provincial Legislature.

References

External links

Living people
Year of birth missing (living people)
Afrikaner people
Members of the North West Provincial Legislature
Freedom Front Plus politicians
21st-century South African politicians